GMA New Media, Inc. (or NMI) is the digital media and technology arm of GMA Network Inc. which offers interactive applications in the television, mobile, web, marketing and online gaming industry. Its headquarters are located at the GMA Network Center in Quezon City, Philippines.

Products and services

Websites
 GMA News Online 
In 2007, GMA NMI launched GMA News Online (then called gmanews). In the same year, the site  won several awards including Best Website in the 9th Philippine Web Awards in 2007 for the Media category.

 GMA Network Portal 

In late 2011, NMI launched GMANetwork, a one-stop portal that consolidates GMA’s web properties including GMA News Online, GMA Entertainment Website , and IMReady Public Service Portal . It won the Digital Filipino Web Awards for the Television category in 2014.

Philippine Entertainment Portal (PEP is a joint venture of NMI (GMA Network Inc.) and Summit Digital which offers entertainment news from the local and international film and television industry.)

Sports Interactive Network (SPIN) is a joint venture of NMI (GMA Network Inc.) and Philippine Entertainment Portal, Inc. which offers local and international sports news.

Mobile applications
 GMA Network
 GMA News
 IMReady
 Kapuso Milyonaryo 
 You Scoop is a joint initiative between NMI and GMA News and Public Affairs (GMA News). The app allows citizen participation in journalism by sending information, photographs, videos or audio recordings of news as they happen. A team of editors screen which crowdsourced news items will be shared on the YouScoop page on GMA News Online or broadcast on GMA News and Public Affairs programs.

Broadcast applications
 GMA Affordabox is a digital receiver that delivers Digital Terrestrial Transmission as well as Over-the-Top (OTT) internet-based content and applications. The device was released on June 26, 2020.
 GMA Now is a DTV dongle used for Android Devices and iPhone users soon. It was released on February 7, 2021 during All-Out Sundays.

Subsidiaries and joint ventures
Digify, Inc.
Digify is a subsidiary of GMA New Media that specializes in solutions for stand-alone digital and integrated marketing campaigns for mobile, web and smart TV applications.

Media Merge Corp.
Media Merge is a subsidiary of GMA New Media that is in charge business development and operations for the Company's online publishing/advertising initiatives.:

Philippine Entertainment Portal, Inc.
Philippine Entertainment Portal is a joint venture of Summit Media and GMA New Media which operates Philippine Entertainment Portal (PEP.ph) and Sports Interactive Network Philippines (SPIN.ph).

Gamespan, Inc. (defunct)
Gamespan is a joint venture of GMA New Media and Manila Jockey Club, Inc. Gamspan operates and manages the computer systems owned by Manila Jockey Club and the infrastructure for taking bets in horse racing and other sports.

X-Play Online Games, Inc. (defunct)
X-Play was a joint venture of GMA New Media, Inc. and IP E-Game Ventures Inc., at present X-Play now operates under IP Ventures Inc.

References

External links
 

GMA Network (company) subsidiaries
Software companies of the Philippines
Technology companies of the Philippines
Mass media companies of the Philippines
Mass media companies established in 2000
Companies based in Quezon City